James Richard Murphy (born December 8, 1957), known as Jim Murphy, is an American businessman and politician. He is a Republican member of the Texas House of Representatives. From 2007 to 2009 and again since 2011, he has represented District 133 in Harris County.

Murphy won a fifth nonconsecutive term in the state House in the general election held on November 8, 2016.

Political career

Multi-billion corporate tax incentive program 
In 2021, Murphy pushed for legislation that would extend a multibillion-dollar corporate tax incentive program in Texas by ten years and expanded the incentives given to companies. Investigative reporting by the Houston Chronicle revealed that nearly all applicants for the corporate tax incentive program had their applications approved, that dozens of companies failed to fulfill its pledges, and that some companies had already completed the projects that they had applied to the program for.

Committee appointments 

Murphy currently sits on these House committees: (1) Corrections (Chair) (2) Ways and Means. In 2007, he was elected president of the freshman class in the House. During his first term, he authored and passed 15 bills, the most by any first-time member. During the 84th Legislative Session, Murphy was elected Texas House Republican Caucus Floor Leader.

Personal life
Murphy is married to Kathleen J. Pace-Murphy, a professor at the Houston School of Nursing within the University of Texas System. Pace-Murphy is a geriatric nurse practitioner. The Murphys have two sons.

References

|-

|-

1957 births
21st-century American politicians
American real estate businesspeople
Businesspeople from Houston
Catholics from Texas
Catholic politicians from Texas
Living people
Republican Party members of the Texas House of Representatives
Politicians from Houston
School board members in Texas
Strake Jesuit College Preparatory alumni
University of Texas at Austin alumni